Alice Jenkins or Alice Brook; born Alice Glyde (1886–1967) was a British abortion campaigner. She co-founded the Abortion Law Reform Association which reformed UK abortion law. Her book "Law For The Rich" proved pivotal in the creation of the UK's 1967 Abortion Act which made abortion accessible in mainland Britain eight days before she died.

Biography
Jenkins was born, Alice Glyde, in Ilkley in 1886. Her mother, Charlotte Glyde, had six children and they all became involved in politics. Her mother was a servant. In 1907 she started a partnership with William James Jenkins, they never married, but they had three children.

On 17 February 1936, Jenkins along with Janet Chance and Stella Browne began the Abortion Law Reform Association (ALRA). At the end of their first year they had 35 new members, and by 1939 they had almost 400. The membership were gathered from the working class using labour groups and women’s branches of the co-operative movement. These women wanted the privileges that “moneyed classes had enjoyed for years.”

The ALRA was very active between 1936 and 1939 sending speakers around the country to talk about Labour and Equal Citizenship and attempted to have letters and articles published in newspapers. They were in the  frame when a member of the ALRA’s Medico-Legal Committee received the case of a fourteen-year-old girl who had been raped, and she received a termination of this pregnancy from Dr. Joan Malleson, a progenitor of the ALRA.

Jenkins wrote an important book titled "Law For The Rich" which was published in 1960. He book drew attention to the double standards that faced women with unwanted pregnancies. Abortion was illegal so many women had to give birth to unplanned children, however rich women could persuade their private doctors that their mental health was at risk. The doctors were then able to carry out an abortion that was denied to most women in Britain.

The ALRA's major victory was to gain the support of the liberal politician David Steel. He was a liberal M.P. who had been lucky enough to win a third chance of placing a private members bill through the house of commons. He rejected a call to amend the rights of plumbers and homosexuals and decided to reform the laws of abortion. He cites Alice Jenkin's argument in her book "Law For The Rich" as being pivotal in his decision. Steele put forward a private members bill that was backed by the government and it resulted in the 1967 Abortion Act.

Views on Catholicism and Irish immigrants
The Dublin-based Life Institute (which opposes abortion), has accused Jenkins' of anti-Irish racism and anti-Catholic bigotry, due to opinions featured in her book Law for the Rich, where she states "Roman Catholic congregations are amongst the most poverty-stricken sections of the community; their numerical strength is growing and their poverty is intensified by their large families. Most people believe in free speech and a free Press, and the Roman Catholic Church has the right to voice its opinions. But we may well ask why it is allowed to exercise so much indirect and often insidious influence in our country, out of all proportion to its numbers. We are told that in 1958 the number of Irish immigrants from Eire (sic) was estimated to be 60,000. The number of marriages solemnised in Roman Catholic Churches in this country is greatly increasing, and, if this trend continues, it looks as though there might be a reversion to Roman Catholicism within 150 years. So it is later than we think! Far too few leading British newspapers concern themselves with this danger." She cites the xenophobic work Your Future is Now by Will Thorne, which complains about "boatload after boatload of Irish" arriving in England, increasing the number of Catholics in the country.

Death and legacy 
Jenkins died on Christmas Day 1967. She was the only surviving member of the original ALRA executive and she did see the act pass into UK law eight days before she died.

References

1886 births
1967 deaths
British abortion-rights activists
People from Ilkley
Anti-Irish sentiment
Anti-Catholicism in the United Kingdom